The Rutgers Journal of Law & Public Policy is a student-run legal journal at Rutgers School of Law. It covers the interaction of law and various areas of public policy. The journal was established in 2004 as the Rutgers Journal of Law & Urban Policy and obtained its current name in 2006.

See also
Edward J. Bloustein School of Planning and Public Policy

References

External links

Rutgers Law School
American law journals
Publications established in 2004
Quarterly journals
English-language journals
Law journals edited by students
Law and public policy journals
Journal of Law and Public Policy